Sanders is a home rule-class city in Carroll County, Kentucky, in the United States. The population was 238 as of the 2010 census.

History
The community was founded at a salt lick on the Buffalo Trace stretching from the Licking River to Drennon Springs. The community was first known as Rislerville for a local shopkeeper, but was known as Sanders' Mill after the local miller Nathaniel Sanders opened a post office in 1816. His son George Washington Sanders continued to operate the mill after his death.

When the community was connected to the Louisville, Cincinnati and Lexington Railroad in 1867, the station was first named Dixie by the locals but then changed to Liberty Station by the railroad, owing to the importance of the station's trade with nearby New Liberty. The name reverted to Sanders in 1874, according to local historian Anna Parker, owing to the influence of State Senator Larkin Sanders, who wanted to honor his father.

Geography
Sanders is located in the southeast corner of Carroll County at  (38.655329, -84.946506), along Eagle Creek, a tributary of the Kentucky River.

Demographics

As of the census of 2000, there were 246 people, 78 households, and 51 families residing in the city. The racial makeup of the city was 97.56% White and 2.44% African American.

There were 78 households, out of which 32.1% had children under the age of 18 living with them, 48.7% were married couples living together, 5.1% had a female householder with no husband present, and 34.6% were non-families. 25.6% of all households were made up of individuals, and 5.1% had someone living alone who was 65 years of age or older. The average household size was 2.63 and the average family size was 3.14.

In the city, the population was spread out, with 22.4% under the age of 18, 8.1% from 18 to 24, 30.9% from 25 to 44, 28.5% from 45 to 64, and 10.2% who were 65 years of age or older. The median age was 40 years. For every 100 females, there were 138.8 males. For every 100 females age 18 and over, there were 172.9 males.

The median income for a household in the city was $36,146, and the median income for a family was $37,708. Males had a median income of $28,250 versus $27,917 for females. The per capita income for the city was $11,230. None of the families and 26.7% of the population were living below the poverty line, including no under eighteens and 71.0% of those over 64.

References

External links
 Historical Images and Texts of Sanders, Kentucky

Cities in Carroll County, Kentucky
Cities in Kentucky